Ames Cottage is a historic cure cottage located at Saranac Lake in the town of Harrietstown, Franklin County, New York.  It was built in 1906 and is a -story wood-frame structure in an asymmetrical cruciform plan.  It has four gables off a central hipped roof, deep boxed overhanging eaves, and exposed rafter ends in the Queen Anne style.

It was listed on the National Register of Historic Places in 1992.

References

Houses on the National Register of Historic Places in New York (state)
Queen Anne architecture in New York (state)
Houses completed in 1906
Houses in Franklin County, New York
National Register of Historic Places in Franklin County, New York
1906 establishments in New York (state)